Belkovo is a rural locality (a village) in Gorkinskoye Rural Settlement, Kirzhachsky District, Vladimir Oblast, Russia. The population was 91 as of 2010. There is 1 street.

Geography 
Belkovo is located 14 km north of Kirzhach (the district's administrative centre) by road. Klimovo is the nearest rural locality.

References 

Rural localities in Kirzhachsky District